Wild Throne was an American heavy metal band from Bellingham, Washington, United States.

History 
The band formed in 2008 as a trio under the name Dog Shredder and were influenced by progressive rock bands such as Yes.
In 2013, the band changed its name to Wild Throne. They signed a recording contract with Roadrunner Records and released their debut release Harvest of Darkness in 2015. The album received positive reviews from Metal Injection and Metal Sucks. The band toured with Red Fang, Royal Thunder and supported Kvelertak in 2016 on their North American tour.

On April 19, 2017, Wild Throne posted on its Facebook page that its members had amicably parted ways.

Discography
 Harvest of Darkness (2015)

Band members
Joshua Holland - vocals, guitars
Noah Burns - drums
Jeff Johnson - Bass

References

External links
 
 Wild Throne at Metal Archives

Heavy metal musical groups from Washington (state)
Roadrunner Records artists